"Ma Qui" is a 1991 fantasy/horror story by American writer Alan Brennert. It was first published in the Magazine of Fantasy & Science Fiction.

Plot summary

After an American soldier is killed in the Viet Nam War, he must find his way to the afterlife — if the ma qui, Vietnamese "angry ghosts", will let him.

Reception

"Ma Qui" won the 1991 Nebula Award for Best Short Story. Kirkus Reviews called it "wrenching".

References

Works originally published in The Magazine of Fantasy & Science Fiction
Nebula Award for Best Short Story-winning works